The Peoria Chiefs are a Minor League Baseball team of the Midwest League and the High-A affiliate of the St. Louis Cardinals. The team was established in 1983 as the Peoria Suns. They are located in Peoria, Illinois, and are named for the Peoria Indian tribe for which the city was named. In 2005, the team replaced the indigenous imagery associated with the Chiefs name and moved to a logo of a Dalmatian depicted as a fire chief. The Chiefs play their home games at Dozer Park, which opened in 2002. They previously played at Vonachen Stadium near Bradley University from 1983 through 2001. The Chiefs have made the playoffs a total of 12 times. Through 7 wild card berths, 3 first-half titles, and 2 second half titles.

History

Prior professional baseball in Peoria
The history of professional baseball in Peoria dates back to the late 19th century when the Peoria Reds, Peoria Canaries, and Peoria Blackbirds played in several early leagues during parts of 1878 to 1895. The first ballpark used by these teams was reportedly called Sylvan Park and was located at the corner of Northeast Glendale Avenue and Spring Street on the location of the present-day St. Augustine Manor. In 1883, the club moved a few blocks toward Peoria Lake, to a facility called Lake View Park, on the southeast corner of Northeast Adams Street and Grant Street, which would remain the home of various Peoria clubs for the next four decades.

The 1895, club was dubbed the Peoria Distillers, referencing the Hiram Walker plant. From 1891 to 1911, Frank E. Murphy from Green Bay, Wisconsin, became involved with baseball, beginning with the purchase of the Peoria team of the Midwest League, which he later renamed the Peoria Hoosiers. That nickname would stick with the various Peoria clubs for the next couple of decades, including their first stretch with the Three-I League from 1905 to 1917. After the resumption of following the peak of American involvement in World War I, the Peoria Tractors name gained favor in 1919, with the growth of the nearby branch of the company later called Caterpillar Inc.

In 1923, the team opened a new ballpark called Woodruff Field in honor of a long-time mayor of Peoria. The new park was just across Grant Street from Lake View Park. The Tractors continued to play in several leagues before folding after the 1937 season. The city was then without professional baseball for the next 15 years. The name Peoria Chiefs first appeared with a new franchise in the Three-I League in 1953. This club disbanded after 1957, and Peoria was again without professional ball, for the next 25 years until the current Chiefs set up shop. The Woodruff Field site is now a softball facility called Woodruff Park.

Current franchise

The Peoria Suns were established in 1983. They played their home games at Meinen Field, built in 1968, near the Bradley University campus. The team's name was changed to the Chiefs in 1984. The 1984 team was managed by future Major League Baseball manager Joe Maddon.

The 1988 team, managed by future major league manager Jim Tracy, was the subject of the Joseph Bosco book The Boys Who Would Be Cubs.

Meinen Field was renovated before the 1992 season and renamed Vonachen Stadium in honor of Chiefs' owner Pete Vonachen. The team moved to a new park in downtown Peoria, Dozer Park, on May 24, 2002. They set a franchise attendance record of 254,407 people in the new park's first year and also won the Midwest League championship.

Former Cubs catcher Jody Davis managed the 2006 team. Baseball Hall of Famer Ryne Sandberg was hired to manage the 2007 Chiefs. The team went 71–68 and finished the second half 40–30 in a tie for the division title, but missed the playoff on a tiebreaker. At the gate in 2007, the Chiefs broke their season attendance record with 259,794 and an average of 3,800 per game. Sandberg returned to manage the Chiefs in 2008. A Midwest League single-game attendance record was set on July 29, 2008, when the Chiefs drew a crowd of 32,103 to Wrigley Field in Chicago for a game against the Kane County Cougars.

The Chiefs affiliation with the Cubs ended following the 2012 season. They then entered into a new player development contract with the St. Louis Cardinals.

In conjunction with Major League Baseball's restructuring of Minor League Baseball in 2021, the Chiefs were organized into the High-A Central. In 2022, the High-A Central became known as the Midwest League, the name historically used by the regional circuit prior to the 2021 reorganization.

Chiefs' brawl on July 24, 2008
In the first inning of a game on July 24, 2008, against the Dayton Dragons, Chiefs' pitcher Julio Castillo hit Dragons batter Zack Cozart in the head. The night before, three Chiefs players had been hit by Dayton pitchers. Two batters later, he hit Angel Cabrera in the arm, and nearly hit another Dragon player in the head after that while Cabrera spiked the Chiefs shortstop at second base on a slide. At that point, Chiefs fill-in manager Carmelo Martinez began arguing with the umpire. This brought out the Dragons manager, Donnie Scott, and the two argued for a few minutes before the umpires broke it up.

During the coaches' argument, pitcher Castillo fired a ball at the Dragons' dugout. The ball struck a fan, who was taken to the hospital. Brandon Menchaca proceeded to tackle Castillo from behind as both benches cleared, delaying the game for 69 minutes. After the game, Castillo was arrested for felonious assault.  The injured fan, Chris McCarthy, suffered a concussion but recovered.

On August 8, 2009, Castillo was convicted of felonious assault causing serious physical injury and was sentenced to 30 days in jail.  In April 2010 a judge released Castillo from probation "on the condition that he leave the United States and not return for a minimum of three years."

Season-by-season records

Roster

Notable alumni

Baseball Hall of Fame alumni

 Greg Maddux (1985) Inducted, 2013
 Ryne Sandberg (2007–08, MGR) Inducted, 2005

Notable award winning alumni
 Jerome Walton (1987) 1989 NL Rookie of the Year
 Rick Sutcliffe (1991)  1979 NL Rookie of the Year; 1984 NL Cy Young Award (Peoria Chiefs MLB rehab)
 Albert Pujols (2000)  2001 NL Rookie of the Year; 3x NL Most Valuable Player (2005, 2008-2009)
 Yadier Molina (2002) 9x Gold Glove; 10x MLB All-Star
 Nomar Garciaparra (2005)  1997 AL Rookie of the Year (Peoria Chiefs MLB Rehab)
 Kerry Wood (2005, 2007)  1998 NL Rookie of the Year (Peoria Chiefs MLB Rehab)
 Scott Williamson (2006)   1999 NL Rookie of the Year (Peoria Chiefs MLB Rehab)
 Josh Donaldson (2008)  2015 AL Most Valuable Player

Notable alumni
 Wally Joyner (1983) 4x MLB All-Star 
 Mark McLemore (1983)
 Devon White (1983) 7x Gold Glove; 3x MLB All-Star
 Joe Maddon (MGR: 1984) 3x Manager of the Year (2008, 2011, 2015); Manager: 2016 World Series Champion Chicago Cubs
 Rafael Palmeiro (1985) 3x Gold Glove; 4x MLB All-Star
 Mark Grace (1986)  3x MLB All-Star
 Joe Girardi (1986) MLB All-Star;  Manager: 2009 World Series Champion New York Yankees
 Dwight Smith (1986)  
 Derrick May (1987)
 Heathcliff Slocumb (1987, 1989) MLB All-Star
 Steve Trout (1987) (Peoria Chiefs MLB Rehab)
 Rick Wilkins (1988) 
 Scott Sanderson (1988) MLB All-Star
 Plácido Polanco (1995) 3x Gold Glove; 2x MLB All-Star
 Cliff Politte (1996) 
 Tom Pagnozzi (1998) 2x MLB All-Star (Peoria Chiefs MLB Rehab)
 Rick Ankiel (1998) 
 Coco Crisp (2000) 2011 AL Stolen Base Leader
 Jesse Orosco (2000) 2x MLB All-Star; (Peoria Chiefs MLB Rehab)
 JD Drew (2001) MLB All-Star (Peoria Chiefs MLB Rehab)
 Dan Haren (2002) 3x MLB All-Star
 Steve Kline (2002) (Peoria Chiefs MLB Rehab)
 Jason Motte (2003) 2012 NL Saves Leader
 Brendan Ryan (2003) 
 Sam Fuld (2005)
 Rich Hill (2005)
 Jody Davis (MGR: 2006)  2x MLB All-Star
 Mark Prior (2006) MLB All-Star (Peoria Chiefs MLB Rehab)
 Jeff Samardzija (2006) MLB All-Star
 Darwin Barney (2007) 
 Henry Blanco (2007)  (Peoria Chiefs MLB Rehab)
 Welington Castillo (2007)
 Wade Miller (2007) (Peoria Chiefs MLB Rehab)
 Scott Eyre (2008)  (Peoria Chiefs MLB Rehab)
 Josh Harrison (2008) 2x MLB All-Star
 Jon Lieber (2008) MLB All-Star
 Chris Archer (2009) 2x MLB All-Star
 Reed Johnson (2009)  (Peoria Chiefs MLB Rehab)
 DJ LeMahieu (2009)  3x Gold Glove; 3x MLB All-Star
 Ted Lilly (2009–10) 2x MLB All-Star (Peoria Chiefs MLB Rehab)
 Aramis Ramírez (2009) 3x MLB All-Star (Peoria Chiefs MLB Rehab)
 Carlos Zambrano (2009) 3x MLB All-Star (Peoria Chiefs MLB Rehab)
 Carlos Silva (2010) (Peoria Chiefs MLB Rehab)
 Jake Westbrook (2013) MLB All-Star (Peoria Chiefs MLB Rehab)
 Jon Jay (2015) (Peoria Chiefs MLB Rehab)
 Javier Baez (2012) 2x MLB All-Star
 Alex Reyes (2014) MLB All-Star
 Carson Kelly (2013–14)
 Harrison Bader (2015) Gold Glove Award winner
 Paul DeJong (2015) MLB All-Star
 Jack Flaherty (2015)
 Sandy Alcantara (2016) 2x MLB All-Star, NL Cy Young Award
 Ryan Helsley (2016) MLB All-Star
 Jhonny Peralta (2016) 3x MLB All-Star (Peoria Chiefs MLB Rehab)
 Jordan Hicks (2017)
 Miles Mikolas (2021) 2x MLB All-Star (Peoria Chiefs MLB Rehab)

References

Sources

External links

 
 Statistics from Baseball-Reference
 Statistics from Stats Crew

Midwest League teams
Baseball teams established in 1983
Chiefs
Professional baseball teams in Illinois
St. Louis Cardinals minor league affiliates
Chicago Cubs minor league affiliates
California Angels minor league affiliates
1983 establishments in Illinois
High-A Central teams